The 3rd Marine Infantry Parachute Regiment is an airborne infantry regiment of the French Army. It is heir to the 3rd Colonial Commando Parachute Battalion created in 1948 and the 3rd Colonial Parachute Regiment . The regiment is part of the 11th Parachute Brigade.

The battalion filled the ranks with the thousands throughout the various campaign battle courses of dissolutions and reformations. The battalions of this regiment are heir to the 1st Colonial Parachute Commando Demi-Brigade, another heir of the paratroopers of Free France, the Demi-Brigade of the SAS, of the Parachute Choc Groupment Battalions, whose regimental colors was decorated with the Légion d'honneur in July 1954.

Creation and different nominations 
 On January 8, 1948 : creation of the battalion at Vannes.
 On November 9, 1948 : administrative creation of the 3rd Colonial Parachute Commando Battalion] (3e BCCP).
 On October 1, 1950 : became the 3rd Colonial Parachute Commando Group (3e GCCP).
 November 1, 1950 : dissolution of the 3e GCCP.
 January 1, 1951 : recreation of the battalion at Saint-Brieuc.
 December 27, 1951 : became the 3rd Colonial Parachute Commando Battalion, 3e BCCP.
 May 28, 1952 : became the 3rd Colonial Parachute Battalion (3e BPC).
 June 1, 1955 : recreation of the 3rd Colonial Parachute Battalion at Mont-de-Marsan.
 November 1, 1955 : became the 3rd Colonial Parachute Regiment (3e RPC).
 December 1, 1958 : became the 3rd Marine Infantry Parachute Regiment (3e RPIMa).

History since 1948

Campaigns 

Created in January 1948, the 3rd Colonial Parachute Commando Battalion 3e BCCP went to Indochina on November of the same year. Cited twice at the orders of the armed forces, the battalion was dissolved in October 1950 after having been destroyed in the Battle of Route Coloniale 4 along the Chinese border. During this episode, 3 BCCP of Captain Cazaux and the 1st Foreign Parachute Battalion of Commandant Pierre Segretain, disappeared.

Recreated on December 27, 1951, the battalion was designated as the 3rd Colonial Parachute Battalion]] 3e BPC, gaining another citation at the orders of the armed forces.

The battalion was then dissolved again, providing the reformation of another battalion.

Recreated again, the battalion was designated as the 3rd Colonial Parachute Regiment (3e RPC) in November 1955 under the orders and disposition of Lieutenant-colonel Bigeard.

3rd Marine Infantry Parachute Regiment (1958–present) 
Designated as the 3rd Marine Infantry Parachute Regiment in December 1958, the regiment joined the metropole and stationed in July 1962. The regiment formed a part of the 11th Light Intervention Division.

In 1968, the regiment intervened in Chad during the first civil war.

The regiment took part in various peacekeeping missions in Lebanon with the United Nations Interim Force in Lebanon first then integrated the corps of the Multinational Force in Lebanon. During one of these various peacekeeping interventions, the regimental commander, Colonel Jean Salvan was severely wounded.

The regiment then deployed in Djibouti, again in Chad, Central African Republic, New Caledonia, Togo, Gabon, the Gulf War, Turkey, Zaire, Ex-Yugoslavia, Congo, and Kosovo where the regiment acquired the fifth respective citation.

The regiment has been deployed in combat, combat support, peacekeeping and multipurpose mission operations throughout the world after the September 11, 2001, terrorist attacks.

During an "open day" for the public on Sunday 29 June 2008 at Laperrine Barracks, Carcassonne, a Sergeant fired a rifle using a magazine containing live bullets rather than blanks as intended. The magazine had remained loaded after an earlier exercise. 17 people were hit by bullets including 15 civilians, including at least four children, the youngest aged 3 who was hit in the heart and arm The most senior of six officers who lost their jobs because of the incident was the Chief of Staff of the French Army, General Bruno Cuche, who resigned two days after the incident after intense criticism from the President of the Republic, Nicolas Sarkozy. Another was the Commander of the Regiment.

Composition 
The regiment is composed of 1120 personnel organized into 8 companies:

 Compagnie de commandement et de logistique (CCL) – Command and logistics company
 Compagnie d'administration et de soutien (CAS) – Administration and support company
 Compagnie d'éclairage et d'appui (CEA) – Reconnaissance and support company
 1re Compagnie de combat – 1st Combat company
 2e Compagnie de combat – 2nd Combat company
 3e Compagnie de combat – 3rd Combat company
 4e Compagnie de combat – 4th Combat company
 Compagnie de réserve (CR) – Reserve company

Traditions 

Except for the Legionnaires of the 1ème REG, 2ème REG, 2ème REP that conserve the Green Beret, the remainder of the French army metropolitan and marine paratroopers forming the 11th Parachute Brigade wear the Red Beret.

The Archangel Saint Michael, patron of the French paratroopers is celebrated on September 29.

The prière du Para (Prayer of the Paratrooper) was written by André Zirnheld in 1938.

Insignia 
Just like the paratrooper Brevet of the French Army, the insignia of French Paratroopers was created in 1946. The French Army insignia of metropolitan Paratroopers represents a closed "winged armed dextrochere", meaning a "right winged arm" armed with a sword pointing upwards. The insignia makes reference to the Patron of Paratroopers. In fact, the insignia represents "the right Arm of Saint Michael", the Archangel which according to Liturgy is the "Armed Arm of God". This insignia is the symbol of righteous combat and fidelity to superior missions. The French Army insignia of Marine Infantry Paratroopers is backgrounded by a Marine Anchor.

Regimental colors 

Since its creation, the regiment has endured the loss of 476 Officers, Sous-Officiers and paratroopers of the 3e RPIMa.

Regimental song 
Hymne du 3e RPIMa "Rien ne saurait t'émouvoir"

Decorations 
The regimental colors of the 3rd Marine Infantry Parachute Regiment (3e RPIMa) are as follows:

 Croix de guerre des théâtres d'opérations extérieures is decorated with:
 3 palms (3 citations at the orders of the armed forces)
 one bronze star (citation at the orders of the brigade)
 Croix de la Valeur militaire is decorated with:
 2 palms (two citations at the orders of the armed forces)

The regiment has received one citation sans croix at the orders of the armed forces for the peace intervention in Lebanon in 1978, which was replaced with a citation bearing attribution of the Croix de la Valeur militaire with palm.

The citation at the orders of the brigade was awarded for action while leading allied forces in Kosovo in 1999.

On May 21, 2012, the regimental colors were decorated again with the croix de la valeur militaire with palm for service in Afghanistan within the cadre of ISAF.

The regiment bears wearing Fourragère:
 Fourragère bearing the colors of the Croix de guerre des théâtres d'opérations extérieures.

Honours

Battle honours 
 Indochine 1948–1950 1952–1953
 Algerian War 1952–1962

Regimental Commanders 

3rd Colonial Parachute Commando Battalion, 3e BCCP
 Chef de bataillon (major) Henri Ayrolles (1948–1949)
 Captain Paul Cazaux (1949–1950)
 Chef de bataillon Decorse (1950)
3rd Colonial Parachute Battalion, 3e BCP
 Captain Louis Bonnigal (1951–1953)
 Captain Jacques Bouvery (1953)
 Chef de bataillon Albert Lenoir (1955)
3rd Colonial Parachute Regiment, 3e RPC
 Colonel Marcel Bigeard (1955–1958)
 Lieutenant-Colonel Roger Trinquier (April 1958 – December 1958)
3rd Marine Infantry Parachute Regiment,  3e RPIMa
 Lieutenant Colonel Roger Trinquier (1958–1959)
 Lieutenant Colonel Louis Bonnigal (1959–1961)
 Lieutenant Colonel Guy Le Borgne (1961–1962)
 Lieutenant Colonel Marcel Mollo (1962–1963)
 Lieutenant Colonel Maurice Escarra (1963–1965)
 Lieutenant Colonel Robert Courtiade (1965–1967)
 Lieutenant Colonel Pierre de Haynin de Bry (1967–1970)
 Lieutenant Colonel Jean Garnier (1970–1972)
 Lieutenant Colonel Raymond Chabanne (1972–1974)
 Colonel Michel Datin (1974–1976)
 Colonel Jean Salvan (1976–1978)
 Lieutenant Colonel Hugues Mircher (1978–1980)
 Lieutenant Colonel Olivier Leblanc (1980–1982)
 Colonel Daniel Roudeillac (1982–1984)
 Colonel Michel Billot (1984–1986)
 Colonel Serge Ménard (1986–1988)
 Colonel Michel Stouff (1988–1990)
 Colonel Pierre Ribeyron (1990–1992)
 Colonel Henri Poncet (1992–1994)
 Colonel Patrick Marengo (1994–1996)
 Colonel Philippe Six (1996–1998)
 Colonel Didier Legrand (1998–2000)
 Colonel Olivier Tramond (2000–2002)
 Colonel Jean-François Hogard (2002–2004)
 Colonel Bruno Guibert (2004–2006)
 Colonel Frédéric Merveilleux du Vignaux (2006–2008)
 Colonel Jean-Pierre Perrin (2008–2010)
 Colonel Philippe Pottier (2010–2012)
 Colonel Mabin (2012–2014)
 Colonel Journé (2014–2016)
 Colonel Durville (2016-2018)
 Colonel Aunis (2018-20..)

Notable members of the 3e RPIMa 
 Général Marcel Bigeard (1916 -2010), regimental commander 3rd Colonial Parachute Regiment 3e RPC (1955–1958) and the 20th Parachute Brigade which included the 3rd Marine Infantry Parachute Regiment along with other regimental, brigade, area forces and regional commands.
 Général François Cann, regimental commander 8th Marine Infantry Parachute Regiment 8e RPIMa (1977–1979)
 Adjudant-Chef Henri Georges Simon
 Jean Yves Socard

See also 
 Jean de Lattre de Tassigny
 Pierre Jeanpierre
 Hélie de Saint Marc
 List of French paratrooper units

References 
 defense.gouv.fr

Sources and bibliographies 
 Collectif, Histoire des parachutistes français, Société de Production Littéraire – 1975.
 Livre ceux du 3e RPIMA Maison d'édition BBK.
 Livre 3e BCCP Indochine 1948 1950 Maison d'édition Hexagone.
 Cyril Bondroit, 3e BCCP, Indochine 1948–1950, Éditions Indo Éditions – 1998 – .

External links 
 Official site – 3e RPIMa
 Le 3e BCCP en Indochine

Parachute infantry regiments of France
Marines regiments of France
20th-century regiments of France
21st-century regiments of France
Military units and formations established in 1948